Emerson Alexander Rodríguez González (born 2 February 1993) is a Venezuelan volleyball player. He competed in the 2020 Summer Olympics.

References

1993 births
Living people
Volleyball players at the 2020 Summer Olympics
Venezuelan men's volleyball players
Olympic volleyball players of Venezuela
21st-century Venezuelan people